"This Dream's on Me" is a song written by Fred Koller, and recorded by American country music artist Gene Watson.  It was released in July 1982 as the first single and title track from the album This Dream's on Me.  The song reached #8 on the Billboard Hot Country Singles & Tracks chart.

Chart performance

References

1982 singles
1982 songs
Gene Watson songs
Songs written by Fred Koller
MCA Records singles